Thomas Crowley Weston  (born 1958) is a New Zealand lawyer and former Chief Justice of the Cook Islands. He is also known as a poet.

Biography
Weston was born in 1958 in Christchurch. He attended the University of Canterbury, from where he graduated with LL.B. (Hons).

Weston has a long history as a commercial litigator.  He was appointed Queen's Counsel in 1999, and later that year was appointed to the Rules Committee, the body responsible for setting court rules. He was reappointed in 2002 for a further term of three years.

From 2006, was a part-time judge of the Cook Islands High Court and Court of Appeal.  Between 2010 and 2016, he was  Chief Justice of the Cook Islands, replacing his legal partner David Williams.

Weston has published several books of poems. Small Humours of Daylight deals mostly with travel by sea between islands, and was reviewed by Graham Brazier for The New Zealand Herald.

Bibliography

Poetry collections
Too Lost to Land (multiple authors) 
The Red Orchestra
The Ambiguous Companion
Naming the Mind Like Trees
Small Humours of Daylight
Only One Question

Books on law
Taking Control: A Seminar on Loss Prevention and Risk Management (co-author)
Competition Law Update (co-author)
Competition Law: Must Knows (co-author)

References

External links
 Tom Weston QC at Bankside Chambers.

Living people
1958 births
Chief justices of the Cook Islands
New Zealand judges on the courts of the Cook Islands
New Zealand King's Counsel
New Zealand poets
New Zealand male poets
People from Christchurch
University of Canterbury alumni
Tom